Kite runner may refer to:

 Kite running, the practice of chasing kites that have been cut loose in kite fighting
 The Kite Runner, a 2003 novel by Khaled Hosseini
 The Kite Runner (film), a 2007 film based on Hosseini's novel
 Kite Runner (play), a stage play based on Hosseini's novel
 Nickname for Aquilonifer, genus of arthropods